The women's high jump at the 2010 European Athletics Championships was held at the Estadi Olímpic Lluís Companys on 30 July and 1 August.

Medalists

Records

Schedule

Results

Qualification

Final

References
 Qualification Results
 Final Results

High jump
High jump at the European Athletics Championships
2010 in women's athletics

de:Leichtathletik-Europameisterschaften 2010/Resultate Frauen#Hochsprung